The 1972 Saint Louis Billikens men's soccer team represented Saint Louis University during the 1972 NCAA University Division soccer season. The Billikens won their ninth NCAA title this season. It was the fifteenth ever season the Billikens fielded a men's varsity soccer team.

Review

Schedule 

|-
!colspan=6 style=""| Regular season
|-

|-
!colspan=6 style=""| NCAA Tournament
|-

|-

References 

 Results

Saint Louis Billikens men's soccer seasons
1972 NCAA University Division soccer independents season
1972 NCAA University Division soccer season
Saint Louis
NCAA Division I Men's Soccer Tournament-winning seasons
NCAA Division I Men's Soccer Tournament College Cup seasons